The 917th Fighter Group (917 FG) is an inactive Air Force Reserve Command unit that was last assigned to the 442d Fighter Wing, Air Force Reserve Command, stationed at Barksdale Air Force Base, Louisiana.

History
Trained to conduct close air support and battlefield interdiction. Provided A-10 fighter training for reserve pilots until 1 Oct 1993 and after Oct 1996. Deployed A-10s and personnel to Italy to support NATO operations in the Balkans, 1993–1996.

Gained B-52s and a bombardment mission in 1993. Transferred B-52 squadron to 307th Operations Group, 8 January 2011, inactivated 26 September 2013 and aircraft transferred to Davis-Monthan AFB, Arizona under the 924th Fighter Group.

Lineage
 Established as 917th Operations Group, and activated in the Reserve, on 1 August 1992
 Re-designated: 917th Fighter Group, 13 January 2011
 Inactivated 26 September 2013

Assignments
 917th Fighter Wing (later Wing), 1 August 1992 – 13 January 2011
 442d Fighter Wing, 13 January 2011 – 26 September 2013

Components
 46th Fighter Training Squadron: 1 August 1992 – 1 October 1993
 47th Fighter Squadron: 1 August 1992 – Present
 93d Bomb Squadron: 1 October 1993 – 8 January 2011

Stations
 Barksdale AFB, Louisiana, 1 August 1992 – 26 September 2013

Aircraft
 A-10 Thunderbolt II

References 

Military units and formations established in 1992
Military units and formations disestablished in 2013
Fighter groups of the United States Air Force